Smeraldo di Giovanni (1365-1444) was an Italian painter of the late-Gothic through early-Renaissance period, active in Florence.

Biography
He worked with Ambrogio Baldese in Orsanmichele in 1402. He is known to have been active in 1420, when he presumably worked in the same studio as Giovanni Dal Ponte (1385- c. 1438; thought to be the same person as Giovanni di Marco). The Scali chapel of Santa Trinita in Florence has a fresco cycle by Giovanni dal Ponte and Smeraldo di Giovanni.

References

1365 births
1444 deaths
15th-century Italian painters
Italian male painters
Painters from Tuscany
Italian Renaissance painters